is the 12th single released by Nana Kitade. It is used as the opening theme for the anime Jigoku Shoujo Mitsuganae. The first press of the normal edition comes with a "Correspondence from Hades "Melancholy Postcard". The limited edition comes in a gorgeous box, and contains a pink straw doll cell phone charm. Track two, "Kagami no Kuni no Aria", is featured in the Japanese release of horror film My Bloody Valentine 3D.

Music video
The music video begins with Kitade walking in a Japanese-styled room. Fully dressed in a kimono, she is seen clutching a deep red flower. As the video progresses, Kitade is shown moving elegantly on the floor, standing up, or holding a red flower in a Japanese-styled tatami room, or in front of a blue screen.

Track listing

Charts

References

External links
 Official Website Sony Music Japan

2009 singles
Nana Kitade songs
Songs written by Nana Kitade
SME Records singles
2009 songs